Corderoite is an extremely rare mercury sulfide chloride mineral with formula Hg3S2Cl2. It crystallizes in the isometric crystal system. It is soft, 1.5 to 2 on the Mohs scale, and varies in color from light gray to black and rarely pink or yellow.

It was first described in 1974 for occurrences in the McDermitt Mercury mine in Humboldt County, Nevada. The name is from the old name of the mine, the Old Cordero Mine.

Structure 
Corderoite has crankshaft chains that are crosswise linked by additional Hg²+. The bond distance between the cation Hg and anion S is 2.422 Angstroms. It has two angles, Hg-S-HG= 94.1º and S-Hg-S= 165.1º. Various sulfide halides of
Hg share the feature of being face-sharing [HgS2X4] −6 polyhedral, as corderoite's polyhedra X=Cl.

Geologic occurrence 
Lake sediments including altered rhyolitic tuff and ash were deposited on the Tertiary rhyolitic volcanic rocks. Corderoite occurs as isolated grains or with cinnabar as replacements. Corderoite  occurs as a low temperature supergene mineral.

References

Grenchischev O. K. and Vasil'ev V. I. (1978) "First find of Corderoite (Hg3S2Cl2) in mercury ores of USSR". Doklady. 246/1-6, 145.
Keller P., Lissner F., and Schleid T. (2005) "Single-crystal structure determination of Perroudite, Hg5Ag4S5 (I,Br)2Cl2, from Tsumeb (Namiba), and its structural relationships to other sulfide halides of mercury and cinnabar." Stuttgart 181/1, 1–9.
Lavrent'ev Y. G. and Vasil'ev V. I. (1986) "New finds and data on the composition of corderoite (Hg3S2Cl2)". Soviet Geology and Geophysics, 27/12, 117–121.
Modreski P. J. (1998) "Eugene Edward Foord, 1946–1998". The Canadian Mineralogist, 36/2, 251–254.

Sulfide minerals
Halide minerals
Mercury(II) minerals
Cubic minerals
Minerals in space group 199
Minerals described in 1974